Lydia Lucy White (born 9 July 1993) from Collier Row, Greater London, is an English singer and television personality. She has been featured in many acts with will.i.am and other musicians. In 2013, she featured in the tenth series of The X Factor, where was mentored by Nicole Scherzinger, reaching the six-chair challenge. In 2016, she reached the final of the fifth series of The Voice UK and was mentored by will.i.am.

Career

The X Factor

In 2013, Lydia was a contestant on the tenth series of The X Factor. At her room audition, she sang "Mamma Knows Best" by Jessie J, followed by her arena audition, where she sang "The Way You Make Me Feel" by Michael Jackson. At Bootcamp, Lydia sang "For Once in My Life" by Stevie Wonder and was given a seat; however, she was eliminated after mentor Nicole Scherzinger swapped her with Abi Alton.

Open Mic UK 
Lydia was a contestant in Open Mic UK in 2014, performing at the Palace Theatre in Essex.

The Voice UK

In 2016, she auditioned for the fifth series of The Voice UK. For her audition, she sang "Trouble" by Iggy Azalea and Jennifer Hudson. Three coaches (will.i.am, Boy George and Ricky Wilson) turned for her; however, she picked will.i.am. At the battles, she sang "Cryin'" by Aerosmith against fellow team member, Irene Alano-Rhodes. She won the battle and advanced to the knockouts. At The Knockouts, Lydia sang "I Knew You Were Trouble" by Taylor Swift, and was chosen, along with Lauren Lapsley-Browne and Lyrickal, to advance to the live shows. In Week 1, she sang "Somebody Else's Guy" by Jocelyn Brown and she advanced to the second live show. In the semi-final, she sang "I'll Be There" by The Jackson 5 and made it through to the final. In the final, she sang "No One" by Alicia Keys and sang Boys & Girls with mentor, will.i.am. She finished in fourth place in the first round of the finals.

Post–The Voice UK
In August 2016, she featured on a song with Cristian MJC called "True Colours".

In March 2017, she announced on Phoenix FM that she was recording her debut album, and previewed new song "Instagram".

Personal life
Lucy used to date Nathan Sykes of The Wanted.

Discography

Singles

As featured artist

Television

References

1993 births
Living people
People from Romford
English women pop singers
21st-century English women singers
21st-century English singers